"Hello" is a song by The Cat Empire. It was released in New Zealand in 2003 as the lead single from their debut studio album, The Cat Empire. It is credited as exposing the band to a more mainstream audience and allowing them to enhance their following.

The song polled at number 6 in the Triple J Hottest 100, 2003.

Track listing

Other uses in media
 Samples of "Hello" have been used in the promos and advertising of the Network Ten TV program The 7PM Project.
 This is the official theme of "Musa da Beleza Interior" (Muse of Inner Beauty), one current sketch of the Brazilian TV program "Pânico na TV".
 In 2011, Pittsburgh Steelers wide receiver Hines Ward and partner Kym Johnson danced to Hello on Dancing with the Stars.
 The song was used in the 2008 Disney movie Beverly Hills Chihuahua.

Charts

References

The Cat Empire songs
2003 debut singles
2003 songs
EMI Records singles